Comilla, officially spelled Cumilla, is the second largest in Chittagong division. It is the administrative centre of the Comilla District. The name Comilla was derived from Komolangko (কমলাঙ্ক), meaning the pond of lotus.

History

Ancient era

The Comilla region was once under ancient Samatata and was joined with Tripura
State.
This district came under the reign of the kings of the Harikela in the ninth century AD. Lalmai Mainamati was ruled by the Deva dynasty (eighth century AD), and (during the 10th and mid-11th century AD). In 1732, it became the centre of the Bengal-backed domain of Jagat Manikya.

The Peasants' Movement against the king of Tripura in 1764, which originally formed under the leadership of Shamsher Gazi is a notable historical event in Comilla. It came under the rule of East India Company in 1765. This district was established as the Tripura district in 1790. It was renamed Comilla in 1960. Chandpur and Brahmanbaria subdivisions of this district were transformed into districts in 1984.

British era

Communal tension spread over Comilla when a Muslim was shot in the town during the partition of Bengal in 1905. On 21 November 1921, Kazi Nazrul Islam composed patriotic songs and tried to awaken the townspeople by protesting the Prince of Wales's visit to India. During this time, Avay Ashram, as a revolutionary institution, played a significant role. Poet Rabindranath Tagore and Mahatma Gandhi visited Comilla at that time. In 1931, approximately 4000 peasants in Mohini village in Chauddagram Upazila revolted against a land revenue tax. The British Gurkha soldiers fired indiscriminately on the crowd, killing four people. In a major peasant gathering, the police fired at Hasnabad of Laksam Upazila in 1932. Two people were killed and many were wounded. Comilla Victoria Government College in the city was named in memory of Queen Victoria. The main meaning of the context is that the people of Comilla have always maintained good relations and harmonized with others.

World War II
Comilla Cantonment is an important military base and the oldest in East Bengal. It was widely used by the British Indian Army during World War II. It was the headquarter of the British 14th Army. There is a war cemetery, Maynamati War Cemetery, in Comilla that was established after World War II to remember the Allied soldiers who died during World War I and II, mostly from Commonwealth states and the United States. There are a number of Japanese soldiers buried there as well, from the Second World War.

War of liberation of Bangladesh

During the war for the liberation of Bangladesh, when Pakistan Army created the 39th ad hoc Division in mid-November, from the 14th Division units deployed in those areas, to hold on to the Comilla and Noakhali districts, and the 14th Division was tasked to defend the Sylhet and Brahmanbaria areas only. Pakistan Army's 93,000 troops unconditionally surrendered to the Joint Coalition forces on 16 December 1971. This day and event is commemorated as the Bijoy Dibos in Bangladesh

Geography

Comilla is bounded by Burichang Upazila and Tripura on the north, Laksham, and Chauddagram on the south, and Barura on the west. The major rivers that pass through Comilla include Gomoti River and Little Feni. The Tropic of Cancer crosses Comilla town on the south side just over the Tomsom Bridge.

Climate
Comilla has a tropical savanna climate. The Köppen-Geiger climate classification is Aw. The climate of Comilla is generally marked with monsoons, high temperature, considerable humidity, and heavy rainfall. The hot season commences early in April and continues until July. About  of precipitation falls annually.

Points of interest
Comilla has a number of tourist attractions. Various archaeological relics discovered in the district, especially from the seventh–eighth centuries, are now preserved in the Mainamati Museum. There is a World War II war cemetery in Comilla, which is protected and maintained by the Commonwealth War Graves Commission.

Sports

Comilla Victorians is a professional cricket team based in Comilla and is the most successful club in the Bangladesh Premier League.

Administration
Comilla is controlled by the Comilla City Corporation. It has 27 wards.

Metro neighbourhoods
These are the neighbourhoods of Comilla:
 Baghmara
 Bara Para
 Belghar
 Bholain (North)
 Bholain (South)
 Bijoypur
 Chapapur
 Durlovpur
 Chouara
 Galiara
 Purba Jorekaran
 Pachim Jorekaran
 Perul (North)
 Perul (South)

Demographics 
At the time of the 2011 census, Comilla City Corporation had a population of 339,133, of which 177,300 were male and 161,833 were female.

Muslims are over 91% of the population, while Hindus make up over 8%.

Transportation

Highway
One of the oldest highways of the Indian subcontinent, 'The Grand Trunk Road', passes through the city. The Dhaka–Chittagong Highway bypasses the city from the cantonment to Shuagaji through Poduar Bazar. The intercity bus terminal is located at Ashrafpur Bus terminal and ShashonGacha.There are many buses to go to Cumilla from Dhaka like Tisha, Royal Coach, Asia Line, Unique etc. Besides these there are also some local buses which take low price from the travellers.

Railway
Comilla is a nearby city of Laksham Junction and Akhaura Railway Junction. Rail connection is available to Dhaka, Chittagong, Brahmanbaria, and Sylhet.

Education

The Board of Secondary and Higher Secondary Education is responsible for holding public examinations (JSC, S.S.C, and H.S.C) in Comilla and five nearby districts.

Media
Daily newspapers published in Comilla include Comillar Kagoj, Daily Amader Comilla, Shiranam, and Rupasi Bangla, established in 1972. Amod, founded in 1955, is the city's oldest weekly newspaper.

Notable residents

 Kazi Zafar Ahmed, Prime Minister
 Kamrul Ahsan: Secretary to the Government and now serving as Bangladesh Ambassador to Russia. Earlier served as High Commissioner to Canada and Singapore.
 Buddhadeb Bosu, Bengali poet, novelist, translator, editor, and essayist.
 Shib Narayan Das, member of BLF. One of the designers of the first flag of Bangladesh.
 Shaheed Dhirendranath Datta was ex-Minister of Law, Language movement activist and Shaheed of 1971.
 Major Abdul Gani, organizer of the First East Bengal Regiment.
 Kazi Nazrul Islam, resided at Comilla.
 Abdul Kadir, poet, researcher and editor.
 Mustafa Kamal served as president of the International Cricket Council. He is a member of the Jatiya Sangsad representing the Comilla-10 constituency and is a former Minister for Planning and current Minister of Finance.
 Shaukat Mahmood, senior journalist and editor of Weekly Economic Times. Elected president of National Press Club.
 Abdul Matin Patwari, former vice-chancellor, Bangladesh University of Engineering and Technology (BUET) and former director general, IUT
 Reba Rakshit, bodybuilder and circus performer, was born in Comilla in the early 1930s.

See also
 List of universities and schools in Comilla

References

External links
 
 City Corporation

 
History of Tripura
8th-century establishments
Populated places in Cumilla District